Roquebrune-sur-Argens is a commune in the Var department in the Provence-Alpes-Côte d'Azur region, Southeastern France. In 2019, it had a population of 14,937.

It lies between the cities of Draguignan to the northwest and Fréjus to the east. The commune consists of the town of Roquebrune-sur-Argens, as well as two smaller villages: La Bouverie north of town and Les Issambres to the south, on the Mediterranean coast. The commune is home to the French National Water Ski Training Site on the Lac du Vaudois, north of Les Issambres.

History
The recorded history of the oldest part of the town of Roquebrune-sur-Argens began around 983. Signs of human settlements, from the local "Bouverian culture", dating from Prehistory, were found in caves near La Bouverie.

Demographics

Economy
 Tourism
 Vineyards and horticulture
 Harbour (with a maritime link to Saint-Tropez harbour)
 Two industrial areas
 National Water Skiing Centre

Sites
 The 1,000-old village, with many chapels
 A 2,000-year-old fishpond
 Local museum of history
 Le Blavet gorge

Notable people
 Xavier Dupont de Ligonnès, suspected murderer of a family in Nantes, disappeared in Roquebrune-sur-Argens.

References

External links
 Roquebrune sur Argens city website
 Roquebrune and Les Issambres Tourist Office website

Communes of Var (department)
French Riviera